MV St Helen was a vehicle and passenger ferry operated by Wightlink on its route from Portsmouth to Fishbourne on the Isle of Wight. Due to her age, she was sold and was removed from service on 26 March 2015. She now operates in Sardinia with the name Anna Mur, operated by Delcomar, together with her sister ship GB Conte, the former .

History
St Helen was built by Robb Caledon Shipbuilders; the last ship to be launched from their Leith Shipyard. She entered service with Sealink on 28 November 1983 shortly after her sister St Catherine, She was positioned on the Portsmouth to Fishbourne route, the route she has taken through her life and was the largest Isle of Wight ferry until 1990 when  was introduced measuring 26 gt more. This was a record held until 2001 when  entered service.

Deck collapse incident
Three passengers and a crew member were injured and transferred to St Mary's Hospital in Newport. The Marine Accident Investigation Branch carried out an investigation.

The ship had just arrived on the 21:30 sailing from Portsmouth with 181 passengers and 11 crew on board.  The next sailing, operated by St Clare, had to wait 90 minutes before being able to dock.

After the incident the St Helen was taken out of service for several weeks while Wightlink engineers removed the mezzanine deck leaving her sister ships St Clare,  and St Faith to run the service.

Sale to Delcomar

After withdrawal from service, the ship was moored at Hythe, but in March 2015 it was reported that Delcomar, a company based in Sardinia, had purchased St Helen for an undisclosed sum. She joined her sister vessel St Catherine (now GB Conte), which was sold to the same company in July 2010. Both ferries currently sail between the Isola di San Pietro and Portovesme; an approximately 40-minute service with a frequency of 17 ferries a day in each direction during the summer season.
St Helen has been renamed Anna Mur.

References

Ferries of England
Ferries of Italy
Ferry transport on the Isle of Wight
Ships built in Leith
1983 ships